The  is a compact, later mid-size sedan manufactured and marketed in Japan by Toyota between 1968 and 2004. Prior to 1972, the model was marketed as the Toyota Corona Mark II. In some export markets, Toyota marketed the vehicle as the Toyota Cressida between 1976 and 1992 across four generations. Toyota replaced the rear-wheel-drive Cressida in North America with the front-wheel-drive Avalon. Every Mark II and Cressida was manufactured at the Motomachi plant at Toyota, Aichi, Japan from September 1968 to October 1993, and later at Toyota Motor Kyushu's Miyata plant from December 1992 to October 2000, with some models also assembled in Jakarta, Indonesia as the Cressida.



History 
The first series, called the Toyota Corona Mark II was an all new vehicle at its introduction in 1968, that sought to offer a car that was just under Japanese government regulations concerning maximum vehicle dimensions and engine displacement, thus allowing the Crown to grow larger and more luxurious. Using the established platform of the Corona sedan but slightly larger and wider, it was exclusive to Toyopet Store locations, and offered as a competitor to the newly introduced Nissan Laurel in Japan, the Isuzu Florian, and the Nissan Bluebird / Datsun 510 internationally that appeared August 1967, and two years after the Mazda Luce in 1966.

At the Mark II's introduction in the late 1960s, Toyota was known as a small, economy car manufacturer. The Mark II allowed Toyota to establish itself as a more mainstream, international automaker and pursue new market opportunities. The Corona Mark II was sold as a larger companion to the Corona, while still being smaller than the Crown. The Mark II introduced a comfortable front-engine, rear-drive vehicle that was larger than older Toyotas while maintaining an affordable price and better fuel economy than vehicles with larger straight-six and V8 engines, and shared most of its technology and appearance with the larger, more prestigious Crown.

As the Mark II began to become popular with drivers around the world, Toyota introduced variations of the Mark II with two different model names, both sedans but with different styling and marketing approaches. The sportier Toyota Chaser appeared in 1977, and later in 1980, the high luxury content Toyota Cresta appeared, and both were exclusive together at Toyota Auto Store locations. As other automakers continued to offer vehicles in this size class, the Mark II's popularity peaked in the 1980s. The Mark II's siblings, the Chaser and the Cresta were discontinued due to declining sales, partly influenced by the Japanese recession that started in the early 1990s, and were combined into the short-lived Toyota Verossa. The Mark II evolved into the Toyota Mark X which was popular in Japan and select international markets until the growing demand for SUVs and crossovers, which saw the Mark X cancelled in 2019.

First generation: Toyota Corona Mark II (T60, T70; 1968–1972) 

The Corona Mark II, first offered for sale in Japan, September 1968, at Toyopet Store dealerships, was intended as an alternative model to the more established luxury sedan, the Crown, sold at Toyota Store dealerships, and the smaller Corona, also available at Toyopet Stores. It was a slightly larger vehicle than the Corona with a higher level of equipment offered at the time, sharing some of the features of the larger Crown, but taking the top position at Toyopet Store locations. At its introduction, the Mark II was third in Toyota's hierarchy of sedans, below the Crown and the all new, hand built, V8-engined limousine called the Toyota Century.

The four-door sedan was designated the T60, and the two-door coupé the T70. In 1970 there were minor cosmetic changes to the front grille. The 1600 cc 7R series engine was replaced by the 1,700 cc 6R series engine. A year later the 1500 cc 2R models were replaced by the 1600 cc 12R engines. Its competitor was primarily the Nissan Laurel in Japan, released earlier that year in April. In Japan, several trim packages were offered, paired with multiple engine displacements due to Japan's annual road tax obligation. The gradually larger engines obligated Japanese buyers to pay more tax, and equipment levels were gradually increased to justify the expense.

The US exported versions arrived for the 1969 model year and often include the more powerful R series motors compared to other regions. Before its US introduction, it appeared in South Africa, which was the first market to receive the 1900 cc engine. While Japan and other markets often had 1.5-litre 2R, 1.6-litre 7R/12R to 1.7-litre 6R models as well. Engines were shared with the Corona, with both using the 2R, and the 12R engine. Transmissions offered were an automatic transmission with three speeds for export and two speeds in Japan, or a choice of either a four- or three-speed manual transmission.

The RT62 sedans and the RT72 coupé feature the 1.9-litre 8R four-cylinder engine, unique to the Mark II. The RT63 sedan, RT73 coupé, and RT78/RT79 station wagons feature a two-litre 18R four-cylinder engine, also unique to the Mark II. The suspension setup uses double wishbone with coil springs at the front and leaf springs at the back with a front-engine, rear-drive powertrain format.

For North America, the Mark II was available with bucket seats for the driver and front passenger, a center console with a floor-mounted manual transmission, electric rear window defroster, and a full size spare tire installed externally and underneath the cargo area on the wagon, with rear seats that fold down to a fully carpeted rear cargo area. The Mark II wagon was the largest wagon Toyota offered in North America, next to the Corona and Corolla wagons; the Crown wagon was no longer sold in North America.

Corona Mark II GSS
In September 1969 the Mark II hardtop coupe, called the "GSS" was introduced.

Second generation: Toyota Mark II (X10, X20; 1972–1976) 

The second-generation was based on a new X series platform, thus abandoning the previous T series chassis. In Japan, the second-generation was renamed the Toyota Mark II, no longer using the prefix "Corona", while internationally the "Corona" prefix was still used. The X10s are sedans and wagons, while the X20 is a two-door coupé. The inline six-cylinder "M" series engine was borrowed from the S60 series Crown, in order to compete better with the Nissan Bluebird / Datsun 610 in North America, and the Nissan Laurel in Japan.

The styling used on the second generation was dramatically different from the first, showing similarities to the S60 series Crown. The appearance reflected a popular styling trend that appeared during the 1960s and 1970s internationally, called "Coke bottle styling" which Toyota adopted for only this generation of the Mark II.

In export markets, a version was sold as a wagon, whilst in the Japanese domestic market it was marketed as a van, intended for commercial usage. Due to the introduction of the Toyota Hilux pickup truck, the previously offered Mark II pickup was discontinued.

The engines offered began with the 1.7-litre inline-four and grew in displacement with increased standard equipment utilizing an overhead camshaft design. The top level GSS hardtop coupe, which was offered as an alternative to the Crown Coupe, offered a twin-cam design with dual carburetors for 1972–1974, upgrading to electronic fuel injection starting in 1975. The X10 through 13 are sedans, 16- and 17-series numbers were reserved for vans, 20 through 23 for coupés, and 26 through 29 for wagons. The only exception to this scheme is the 18R-U–engined RX15, introduced in June 1976, which received the same chassis code whether fitted in the hardtop or the sedan.

Engine choices included:
 I4 1,707 cc 6R
 I4 1,808 cc 16R (RX11/RX17V/RX21/RX27)
 I4 1,968 cc 18R (RX12/RX22/RX28)
 I4 1,968 cc 18R-G DOHC (RX22 GSS)
 I4 1,968 cc 18R-U (RX15, low emissions version)
 I6 1,988 cc M (MX10/MX20/MX27)
 I6 2,253 cc 2M (MX12/MX22/MX28, export only)
 I6 2,563 cc 4M (MX13/MX23/MX29, export only)

In August 1973, there were minor changes and updates. The basic trim package wagon was offered with a five-speed manual transmission. Electronic fuel injection was introduced on the two-litre four-cylinder (18R) engine to increase power and lower fuel emissions. The four-cylinder 1,707 cc 6R engine was replaced by the 1,808 cc 16R. The 1.8 was discontinued in October 1975, leaving only two-litre engines of four or six cylinders in the Japanese market. Even after the introduction of the next Mark II, production of the second generation continued through November 1976.

North America
The Crown line of cars was no longer marketed in North America due to poor sales. This left a gap in Toyota's North American line up, offering only smaller compact cars. The second-generation Mark II fortunately increased in size. The Mark II would be one of the few sensible options for families transitioning from larger American Detroit cars in the midst of the oil crisis. In 1974 it was marketed in the U.S. as a fully loaded car with few added options. Standard features included a six-cylinder SOHC engine, four-speed manual transmission, front disc brakes, heater defroster, and bucket seats. Some available options were stereo cassette player, power steering, air conditioning, and a three-speed automatic transmission.

North American market cars had the 2.3-litre M-series "six" when they first went on sale in early 1972, but in August of that year this was replaced by the larger 2.6-litre 4M unit. This was the only engine offered for the Mark II's next four years in the North American markets.

Third generation: Toyota Mark II (X30, X40; 1976–1980) 

The third generation was introduced with a more upscale, European type design. The lines are a combination of the previous generation's American styling with a British-looking front end, while demonstrating a new corporate Toyota appearance with the larger S80 series Crown. This model generation was amongst the last cars to feature the Toyopet brand name, which was dropped in 1980. The Toyopet name continued to be used for the dealership network in Japan, however. The Grande trim was added to models with six-cylinder engines. This generation continued to offer Japanese buyers an alternative to the Nissan Laurel sedan, and the new Nissan Bluebird based Nissan Maxima in North America, with the new Chaser as an alternative to the Nissan Skyline in Japan. The Mark II was split into two other sedans so that they could sell different versions of the Mark II at the multiple dealerships Toyota had established in the 1970s.

Some models had six-cylinder engines, optionally with electronic fuel injection, borrowed from the larger Crown. For the Japanese market, all Japanese models engines were upgraded with Toyota's TTC-C technology to comply with the Japanese Government's Clean Air Act of 1975. In late October 1977 the 3T-U engine was upgraded to pass the 1978 emissions standards with the aid of a lean-burn design. Four-cylinder engines were mostly reserved for cars intended for commercial usage. The X30-series chassis numbers were the original codes for the third-generation Mark II, with X40 numbers being gradually introduced about halfway through the life of the model for cars that could pass the new, stricter 1978 emissions rules. In October 1979 a diesel-engined Mark II went on sale, a first for the badge as an alternative to the diesel-powered Isuzu Florian.

In 1998, Toyota released a car called Progrès. The Progrès front end looks somewhat like an updated version of the X30/X40 series sedan. For instance, both of them feature a combination of round and squared lighting. The grille and bonnet also has similar shapes, size, and lines.

Chaser 

The Toyota Chaser was released in 1977 as a competitor to the Nissan Skyline sedan. The first Chaser was a  Mark II with a lightly differing front and rear treatment, of a performance class compared to the Mark II, and replaced the previous generation Mark II GSS hardtop coupe. Later generations received more differentiated styling. The idea of the Chaser was to offer a sportier version of the Mark II and sold at a different Japanese Toyota dealership called Toyota Auto Store, often with more powerful engines and different suspension setups.

Cressida 
The Corona Mark II was renamed the Toyota Cressida for export markets, and the name Cressida was not used in Japan. Production started in December 1976. The name Mark II was previously identified with the North American Continental Mark II which first appeared in 1956 and the term "Mark" is still associated with Lincoln Motor Company products. It was Toyota's largest sedan and wagon range offered in North America, while the personal luxury coupé wasn't offered. In New Zealand, a two-litre four-cylinder sedan version replaced the six-cylinder Crown in local assembly after the 1970s oil crises prompted the government to impose a 60% sales tax on cars with engines larger than two litres. A few fully built up Crowns were subsequently imported. In other markets, the larger Toyota Crown also remained available.

The name "Cressida" derives from the lead character in William Shakespeare's play Troilus and Cressida, inspired by Cressida, a female Trojan character.

Depending on the market it was sold in, it had the 4M carbureted engine (MX32, MX36), the 18R engine (RX30, RX32, RX35) or 3T engine (TX30). The North American models started with the carbureted 4M engine (MX32) but in mid-1978 the fuel-injected 4M-E replaced its carbureted counterpart – this was one of the first Toyotas in the US to use fuel injection. In New Zealand, where it was locally assembled and sold in a highly specified GL form (replacing the 2.8-litre Crown which had been hit by high sales taxes on two-litre-plus engine sizes), it had the 18R engine. Australian-market Cressidas received the 2.6-liter 4M engine, although in de-smogged form (meeting ADR27) it only produced  for relatively leisurely performance.

Standard features included air conditioning, automatic transmission (a 5-speed manual was available), power steering, rear seat armrests, AM/FM cassette stereo with amplifier, reclining front seats, and a rear window defroster. The automatic transmission was a four-speed overdrive with an overdrive lockout. Power windows were optional. Soundproofing was extensive, and the Cressida was famous for being one of the quietest cars on the road at the time.

In the United Kingdom, the Cressida was available in both sedan and wagon body styles. The only engine available was the 18R and there was one trim level, badged De Luxe. Contrary to common practice, this was not the same as DX specifications on other Toyota cars, but a more upmarket version of the DX trim level. The Toyota Carina sedan and wagon also sold in the United Kingdom at this time were also badged as De Luxe (but were rebadged as DX from 1980 onwards).

South African Cressidas all received the 2.0-litre 18R engine, and were introduced in November 1977. The engine was built in South Africa by Toyota's Motor Assemblies subsidiary. Originally only a fully equipped L version was available, with a lower-priced semi-deluxe version appearing in the first month of 1978. A station wagon, Toyota's first in South Africa, appeared in August 1978. It was available in either semi-deluxe or full deluxe trim, the latter only as an automatic.

Fourth generation: Toyota Mark II (X60; 1980–1984) 

The fourth-generation Mark II was introduced in 1980. It was still badged as the Mark II but many of the advertisement at the time simply refer to it as the Mark II. The two-door coupé was no longer offered in this generation, replaced by the Soarer, and the fourth generation was only available with four doors, either as a sedan, hardtop, or as a station wagon (mainly marketed as a commercial vehicle in Japan). Power by either the 1G-EU, Turbocharged M-TEU, 5M-EU, and a fuel-injected version of the twin-cam 18R-G was available in the GT. 2.2 and 2.4-liter diesel engines of the L family were also available, with turbocharging available for the larger engine. In 1982 the twin-cam 1G-GEU engine was added. In 1983 the automatic transmission was changed to an electronic controlled four-speed. The top-of-the-line "Grande" version continued to be available, only in combination with the more powerful engine options.

The Van generally received less powerful engines and has very sparse equipment, and was shorter than its passenger car equivalent due to the use of more compact bumpers. This Mark II generation included commercial, taxi, and drivers training vehicles. The Mark II was common alongside the slightly smaller Corona as a taxi.

The X60 Mark II introduced the world's first voice warning system developed and offered as standard. In Indonesia, it was sold as the Mark II with the  DIN (105 PS JIS) 21R engine (RX60) beginning in late 1981.

Cressida 
The second-generation Cressida, the MX63 (sedans for model years 1983 and 1984 with new IRS, the Wagon and solid rear axle model is the MX62), was a significant redesign from the previous generation. Gone was the coupé version, but a more up-to-date body style was new for the sedan and wagon. The 5M-E would power the 1981 and 1982 model years before it was superseded by the 5M-GE, a DOHC engine with a substantially higher power rating,  in 1983 and 1984. North American X60-series Cressidas all received versions of the 2.8-litre inline-six engine, while in other markets smaller units were often available.

Much like the contemporary Camry and Corolla, the US market Cressida had a unique interior that differed from other LHD variants, including those sold in nearby Canada, in order to satisfy American design tastes and certain federal requirements. While other LHD Cressidas had essentially a mirror image of the RHD interior sold in markets like Japan and Australia, the US spec interior had a unique steering wheel, completely different bottom half of the dashboard with more luxurious soft touch materials, and the major addition of the automatic shoulder belts, which were not offered in any other market. 

The Cressida was the first car to offer an automatic motorized passive seat belt system, a full year ahead of the legal requirement taking effect. The center console is also different and includes two levers for both driver and passenger with "LIFT FOR EMERGENCY EXIT" decals that are designed to release the tension in the automatic shoulder belts when they lock up as designed in a collision or panic stop situation. The US-market 1981 Cressida was the first car to come with motorized automatic shoulder harnesses which wrapped around front seat occupants when the door was closed and the ignition switched on. All US-market Cressidas from 1981 on were so equipped.

In 1983, the Cressida was refreshed and gained an independent semi-trailing link rear suspension, rear vented disc brakes, and the 5M-GE engine. Much of this technology came from the Toyota Supra parts bin with minor differences. A five-speed manual transmission was available, but cars equipped with it were considerably more rare than automatic versions. The electronically controlled A43DE automatic transmission was another improvement over the previous hydraulically controlled A43DL transmission and had three modes: Power, Normal, and Economy. This iteration was praised for its handling, ride, quiet interior, and most of all, its reliability; the Cressida was quickly gaining a reputation for outstanding ownership.

In August 1983, Toyota chairman Eiji Toyoda initiated the F1 project ("Flagship" and "No. 1 vehicle"; alternatively called the "Circle-F" project), a clandestine effort aimed at producing a world-class luxury sedan for international markets. This led to the creation of an all new, full size luxury sedan designed for export markets and ended up called the Lexus LS.

Australia and New Zealand
This model was again assembled in New Zealand initially only with a two-litre, four-cylinder petrol engine and five-speed manual or optional three-speed automatic transmission. Various markets received different bodywork, combining various elements of the Mark II, Chaser, and Cresta variants.

After the mid-generation facelift, a mid-grade specification similar to the original one-model line was offered on New Zealand assembled models with the four-cylinder engine; a new top version had a two-litre six-cylinder engine, four-speed automatic and air conditioning, becoming the first NZ-built Toyota to have 'air' as standard. A large number of the four-cylinder cars with dealer-fitted air conditioning were sold to car hire company Hertz Rent A Car. Both engines were below two litres to avoid the higher sales taxes that applied on larger engines in New Zealand at the time.

Europe
This model was sold as a Cressida in Europe as well, albeit only in a few markets and never in significant numbers. Toyota was withdrawing from the large car categories in Europe at this time, focusing on the smaller vehicles. The Crown had been discontinued in many European markets, leaving the Cressida as the biggest Toyota available. European market Cressidas were generally fitted with two-liter inline-fours or -sixes (21R, 1G), and the 2.2-liter L diesel was a popular option in some places.

The Swedish- and Swiss-specification models have their own emissions controls due to those countries' peculiar legislations; its 1972-cc 21R-U engine produces  at 5200 rpm.

Chaser 
Production swapped to the X51 and X61 Chaser in 1980, with the addition of the 6-cylinder 2.0 L 1G-EU (single cam) and 1G-GE (twincam) engines. Body styles offered were a four-door sedan and 4-door hardtop, no longer offering the 2-door hardtop with this generation. The "Avante" trim level had a sport tuned suspension using Michelin tires. This generation saw a new competitor from Nissan called the Nissan Leopard with a lower asking price in comparison to the Japanese market favorite, the Skyline.

Fifth generation: Toyota Mark II (X70; 1984–1997) 

Arriving in August 1984, the fifth generation dropped the "Corona" name in Japan and became simply the Toyota Mark II. This generation Mark II had a lot of rivals including the Nissan Leopard, as well as the traditional competitor Nissan Laurel sedan. The Mark II continued to remain very viable for fleet sales, government agencies and taxi services.

There are two different variations of the Mark II; the Hardtop and the Sedan. Visually they are different on the exterior while the interior remains untouched. Exterior changes on the Hardtop version includes a slanted nose which requires a new grille, a thinner headlamp assembly that match the slanted nose, frameless door windows, thinner tail lamp, front fenders and bumper. Body panel is stamped different from the standard version. The Standard version is exactly like the MX73 Toyota Cressida. It does not have the aggressive slanted front end, conservative body panels and framed windows.

The Mark II (and its sister cars) received the powerful Twin Turbo version of the 1G inline-six in October 1985. This  engine made the earlier turbocharged M-TE engine superfluous and it was discontinued. In August 1986 the range received a minor facelift and some technical improvements. The 1.8-liter LPG engine was replaced by a 2-liter version.

Station wagon/van (1984–1997) 
The X70 station wagon was produced from 1984 to 1997 with only a few minor revisions over the years. In most markets, sales of this wagon was stopped when the next model of the sedan was introduced but they continued to be sold in Japan for use as delivery vehicles. It was finally superseded by the front-wheel-drive Mark II Qualis that was based on the Camry Gracia.

Cressida 

In 1984 for the 1985 model year, a new Cressida was introduced by Toyota. This was the MX73 (MX72 for wagon). The 5M-E engine was mostly unchanged from the 1984 model year but gained a knock-sensor, which detected pre-ignition and adjusted timing accordingly when a lower-grade fuel was used. Later, the twin-cam 5M-GE engine replaced the 5M-E. The bodystyle was all-new, larger, and more aerodynamic than previous generations. Like its main competitor at the time, the Nissan Maxima, it was given the "compact" designation, though it had grown in size. New options included were an electronic shock absorber control (TEMS), CD player, super monitor, digital gauges, standard woodgrain trim, and secondary radio controls that were placed right by the steering wheel for easier access while driving.  The Cressida was offered with the W58 manual transmission, but was very uncommon and only in the 1986 model.

The US-spec Cressida continued to offer a unique interior that differed from other LHD markets, including Canada. The major difference was the automatic shoulder belts, along with unique steering wheel, and different dash board design.

The automatic transmission retained its Normal/Power selector as many other Toyotas would, but later in production, the Economy selection was dropped. In 1987 the automatic transmission was changed to the A340E that was also used with the 7M-GE and Lexus 1UZ-FE engine at the time. The 1988 model was not offered with a manual transmission and the wagon was discontinued in 1987.

Cressida badging was also used in other export markets with smaller engines. In Indonesia, the Cressida GLX-i was available with a  version of the two-liter 1G-E engine with no emissions controls and low compression suitable for lower-octane petrol.

Chaser 

The accompanying Chaser sedans was also upgraded to the X70-series.

Sixth generation: Toyota Mark II (X80; 1988–1995) 

First released in August 1988, the Mark II was no longer the top level sedan at Toyopet Store locations in Japan with the introduction of the Toyota Celsior 9 October 1989. The Australian Cressida was withdrawn from sale in early 1993 on the X80 series so as not to compete against the new widebody Camry-Vienta, and Lexus ES300 and LS400. The North American Cressida was discontinued after the 1992 model year, and it would be a few years before the succeeding Toyota Avalon debuted for the 1995 model year; the Avalon was introduced as Toyota's first designed-for-America large sedan with a FF layout (V6 engine and front-wheel drive) derived from the stretched Camry platform which contrasted with the Cressida's FR layout (straight-6 engine and rear-wheel drive).

The Grande G series used the 3.0L 7M-GE engine, and featured traction control and ABS. In 1990, 1JZ-GE and 1JZ-GTE (280 PS) was introduced, replacing the 1G-GZE. The GT model was only available with an automatic transmission. All six-cylinder X80 models used independent rear suspension, while the four-cylinder models had solid rear axles.

After 1992, the X80 series continued to be produced for taxi fleet vehicles until 1995, when the Comfort assumed taxi duties.

Cressida 
Toyota introduced the slightly larger fourth generation of the Cressida, the MX83, in 1988 for the 1989 model year – the final generation for the Cressida in North America.

As with the powertrain, most other mechanicals were modified versions of those in the Supra, most notably the new double-wishbone rear suspension. Standard equipment included power windows and locks, cruise control, a tilt-telescoping steering wheel, and a four-speed automatic transmission. Options included antilock brakes, a power driver's seat, leather upholstery, power moonroof, and a CD player. Cressidas of this generation sold in North America featured motorized automatic seat belts; airbags were never offered.

The Cressida was praised for its ride, handling, fuel mileage for its class (23 mpg [US] average according to a July 1989 Consumer Reports test), and reliability. Downsides include a somewhat uncomfortable back seat, ride quality that deteriorated with a full load of passengers, and a trunk with only 12.5 cubic feet of space.

The most substantive change was the 1990 facelift for model year 1991, which brought brighter alloy wheels, a redesigned grille containing the new Toyota "T" logo, and simplified climate controls.

In the Middle East, the Cressida had a 2.4-litre 22R engine producing  at 6,000 rpm. At its peak, the Cressida was so popular in the Middle East that almost every five in 10 cars was a Cressida. This was popular as both a taxi and with private buyers alike due to its immense reliability, tough body panels, cheap spare parts and relatively comfortable ride. The Cressida was sold until the end of 1995 in the Middle East with the Camry immediately positioned as the successor.

In Australia, the Cressida was sold from April 1977 to February 1993, when it was replaced by the Vienta (and later the Avalon in the full-size bracket).

The Cressida also played a part in the design of the first Lexus models, most closely resembling the LS 400. However, some of the shared concepts and similarity between the Cressida and early Lexus models in turn led to the decision to eventually discontinue the Cressida in most markets, as it would overlap with vehicles sold under the Lexus marque. The 1992 redesign of the Camry and introduction of the XLE V6 model helped cover the Cressida's market as well, despite the fact it was a more economy-oriented and front-wheel-drive vehicle, while the Cressida was high-end and rear-wheel-drive.

The introduction of the Toyota Avalon in the American market in 1995 filled the gap left by the cancellation of the Toyota Cressida in 1992. The Avalon was a front-wheel drive full-size car, powered by a V6 engine, as the third-generation Camry remained in the mid-market but now had grown in proportions to be classified as a mid-size. The Cressida was an upper-level mid-size rear-wheel drive car with a straight-six engine, as the mid-market second-generation Camry was still classified as a compact car in the early 1990s. The Lexus GS, introduced in 1993 – one year after the Cressida's discontinuation – could also be considered a spiritual successor to the Cressida, as a midsize rear-wheel drive Toyota luxury vehicle with a strong kinship to the Toyota Supra and also derived from a shortened version of the Toyota Crown platform.

Comfort (XS10; 1995–2018) 

The Comfort was released on December 19, 1995 as a fleet-oriented replacement for the X80 series Mark II in Hong Kong, Indonesia, Japan, Macau and Singapore. The Comfort was based on the X80 chassis but featured a new body design for increased interior space. A long-wheelbase version called Crown Comfort was also available, while a better-appointed version of the Crown Comfort called Crown Sedan (not to be confused with the Crown executive car) was available in Japan only. The Crown Comfort was popular among taxicab operators in Japan, Hong Kong and Singapore, but is gradually falling out of favour as better-appointed vehicles become available at competitive cost. In Japan, it was also a popular driver's education car.

The Comfort was removed from Toyota's Japanese website on 25 May 2017, with production of existing orders ceasing in January 2018. It was replaced by the JPN Taxi which was launched at the 45th Tokyo Motor Show in October 2017. The Comfort nameplate would later be reused on a rebadged version of the JPN Taxi sold in Hong Kong.

Seventh generation: Toyota Mark II (X90; 1992–1996) 

A redesigned Mark II was released in October 1992, called the X90-series. It received a new front bumper (including grille), rear bumpers and tail lights and some weight mainly due to regulations. The Mark II had also grown. Under Japanese exterior dimension regulations, this series was no longer regarded as a "compact car". Buyers who wanted a sedan that remained under the guidelines were now served by the 1990 SV30 series Toyota Camry. Toyota added a new sedan, called the Toyota Scepter with the major difference being a front-wheel-drive powertrain. Styling of this generation showed a corporate similarity to the Toyota Windom, which was exclusive to Toyota Corolla Store locations. The Mark II sedans (and X70 wagons and van) was planned to sell about 14,000 units per month, while the sister models Cresta and Chaser were expected to have monthly sales of 7000 and 6000 units respectively.

The X90 series was available in six different trim levels. All trims came standard with fully automatic air conditioning and faux wood interior paneling. The base GL was available in either standard or automatic with a choice of a diesel or petrol four-cylinder engine. The slightly more up-market Groire had the same engine and transmission options as the GL with more standard features over its inferior. The diesel engine was now fitted with electronic fuel injection and had lower NOx emissions.

The next four trim levels featured only petrol straight sixes for engines and either rear- or all-wheel drive. The Grande was available with either a 2.0L 1G-FE or 2.5L 1JZ-GE and either a four-speed automatic or 5-speed manual for 1G-equipped Mark II Grandes. The Grande was otherwise identical to the Groire in terms of options and equipment. The Grande G was available with either the aforementioned 1JZ or a 3.0L 2JZ-GE mated to an automatic transmission and came with ABS, Digital Instrument cluster, and traction control standard.

The Tourer S came with a 1JZ-GE engine, 4-speed automatic and several options either standard (such as ABS and control) or not present (a factory limited-slip differential) in either the Grande or Grande G.

Lastly, the Tourer V had a reinforced body, sport suspension, and a twin-turbo  2.5-litre 1JZ-GTE inline-six engine. It also came from the factory with, traction control, ABS, an optional torsen LSD and optional 5-speed manual transmission. The Mark II Tourer V was a popular choice among tuners, enthusiasts, and drifters.

The hardtop approach was used on various segments of core Toyota sedans by offering a more upscale hardtop version. These cars were offered for consumers who wanted the luxurious approach offered by the Toyota Crown hardtop and sedan, as well as the Mark II (four-door hardtop), Cresta (four-door sedan) and Chaser (four-door hardtop and performance enhancements), and the next segment down on the Corona and Carina, called the Toyota Corona EXiV and the Toyota Carina ED, with the Toyota Corolla Ceres and the Toyota Sprinter Marino at the lowest segment, which were all offered at reduced prices and tax liability based on the vehicles size. The various versions were sold at different Toyota dealerships dedicated to particular models.

Eighth generation: Toyota Mark II (X100; 1996–2000) 

Like its predecessor, the X100-series Toyota Mark II was available in multiple trim levels. New for this production run was the introduction of all-wheel drive to Grande and Grande G as well as the use of Toyota's new VVTi system on its engines. Also new was the standardization of ABS and a new electronic traction control system. The Groire trim level was also dropped for this production run.

The base GL came with only the 2.4-litre 2L-TE turbo-diesel straight-four mated to a four-speed automatic. It came with basic features like power windows and door locks and automatic air-conditioning, but sportier options were only available on higher-level trims. However, traction control and ABS were available as options.

The Grande trim levels had a plethora of options and features available not limited to but including tilt-steering, standard ABS, traction control and AWD. The base Grande was powered by either the 2.0-litre 1G-FE inline-six mated to a 5-speed manual transmission or 4-speed automatic, the 2.4-litre 2L-TE mated to a four-speed automatic from the GL or the 2.5-litre 1JZ-GE, turning a four-speed automatic as well. New for 1996 was the Grande Four: a four-wheel-drive variant of the Grande, it was powered by the 1JZ-GE and mated to a 4-speed automatic transmission sending power to all wheels via a center differential. The Grande G versions were available with either a 1JZ- or 2JZ-GE and a 4-speed automatic. The "G package" included leather anointments for the steering wheel and seats as well as power front seats. A Grande G Four was also offered with the 1JZ engine, 4-speed auto transmission and all-wheel drive.

The Tourer trim level carried on from the X90 series in both Tourer S and Tourer V. The Tourer S was powered by a naturally aspirated 1JZ-GE and mated to a 4-speed automatic. The Tourer V received some noticeable tweaks from its X90 series counterpart: along with the implementation of ETCS and VVTi, the engine now received forced induction through one large turbocharger as opposed to two smaller ones in a parallel configuration. According to Toyota, this smoothed out the torque curve allowing the engine to deliver more torque at a lower RPM and with VVTi, improved the car's fuel economy.

Mark II Qualis (XV20; 1997–2002) 

So as to continue to offer Mark II customers the option of purchasing a station wagon at Toyopet Store locations, Toyota introduced the Toyota Mark II Qualis which was nearly identical to the Camry-based station wagon called the Camry Gracia. The Gracia was exclusive to Toyota Corolla Store locations next to the Camry.

Ninth generation: Toyota Mark II (X110; 2000–2007) 

This last generation of Mark II hosted several new technologies for Toyota. The new 2.5L with the designation of 1JZ-FSE is the first application of Direct Injection for mass production on a Toyota passenger vehicle. This version of the JZ series engine features a redesign head to optimize fuel economy and performance. Along with the 1JZ-FSE, the 1G-FE, 1JZ-GE and 1JZ-GTE are available and all with VVT-i technology. This generation of Mark II also host a new feature call Navi AI-shift, which uses GPS signals and shifts the automatic transmission into the appropriate gear.

The X110 series discontinued the hardtop version in favor of the standard version.

During this time, Toyota has discontinued the Chaser and Cresta nameplate and created the Verossa. Toyota has also eliminated the Tourer S and Tourer V and instead called their sportier version 2.5 Grande iR-S and 2.5 Grande iR-V, respectively. iR meaning Intelligent Rapidly. Other models include the 2.0 Grande, 2.5 Grande, 2.5 Grande G, 2.5 Grande G-tb, 2.5 Grande G Four, 2.0 Grande Four, and the 2.0 Grande Four "S package" all of which is their luxury lineup.

Minor changes was made in 2002. New headlight, grille and a redesign bumper freshen up the front end while a new taillight design and new chrome trim for the trunk handle finish up the rear end. The introduction of the 2.0L iR grade was added alongside the iR-S and iR-V. The iR-V was the only model to feature a hand brake (instead of a floor mounted E-brake) and was the only model to include an optional R154 5 speed manual transmission. The G-tb model was discontinued in favor for the 2.0L iR model. Another model introduced by Toyota for the Mark II is their special edition, Regalia, which marks the 35th Anniversary of the Mark II nameplate.

Mark II Blit (X110; 2002–2007) 

The Mark II Blit was the wagon version of the X110 Mark II. It was introduced in January 2002 as a replacement of the Toyota Mark II Qualis. The Blit was a return to the Mark II platform with rear wheel drive and optional AWD and not a wagon version of the front wheel drive Camry. The Blit used straight-six engines with an optional turbo that was discontinued in May 2006. The engines used were the same as the sedan model.

The Mark II Blit was exclusive to Toyota Japanese dealership Toyopet Store continuing to offer the Mark II in a station wagon.

Sales

References 

Mark II
Sports sedans
Police vehicles
All-wheel-drive vehicles
Cars introduced in 1968
1970s cars
1980s cars
1990s cars
2000s cars